In-law may refer to:
Affinity (law), kinship by marriage, such as:
Parent-in-law, a mother-in-law or father-in-law
Sibling-in-law, a sister-in-law or brother-in-law
In-law apartment, a type of secondary residence
In-Laws, an 2002-2003 American situation comedy that aired on NBC
The In-Laws, a 1979 American action-comedy film starring Alan Arkin and Peter Falk
The In-Laws, a 2003 American comedy film starring Michael Douglas and Albert Brooks

See also
Kinship terminology